René Vandereycken (born 22 July 1953) is a Belgian football manager and a former player. He was the head coach of the Belgium national team from 1 January 2006 to 7 April 2009.

Club career
Vandereycken was born in Spalbeek. He played for Club Brugge, Genoa and Anderlecht.

International career
As a player, he got 50 caps and scored three goals for the Belgium national team, and represented Belgium at the Euro 1980, in the final of which he scored a penalty.

Coaching career
Vandereycken coached FC Twente as well as R.S.C. Anderlecht for some months and was fired by K.R.C. Genk in June 2005 after he managed to qualify the team for the UEFA Cup. The other teams he managed were Gent, Standard, RWDM and Mainz 05. Vandereycken is known to like the defensive play and to be a tactician.

He was the head coach of the Belgium national team from January 2006 to April 2009. During this time, he was subject to a lot of criticism in the press for his tactical decisions. He was sacked on 7 April 2009 after not managing to get any points from two matches against Bosnia in World Cup qualifying.

Honours

Player 

Club Brugge

 Belgian First Division: 1975–76, 1976–77, 1977–78, 1979–80
 Belgian Cup: 1976–77
 Belgian Super Cup: 1980
 European Champion Clubs' Cup: runner-up 1977–78
 UEFA Cup: runner-up 1975–76
 Japan Cup Kirin World Soccer: 1981
 Jules Pappaert Cup: 1978

Anderlecht
 Belgian First Division: 1984–85, 1985–86
 Belgian Super Cup: 1985
 UEFA Cup: runner-up 1983–84
 Bruges Matins: 1985
 Jules Pappaert Cup: 1983, 1985

Belgium
 UEFA European Championship: runner-up 1980
 FIFA World Cup: 1986 (fourth place)
 Belgian Sports Merit Award: 1980

Manager 
 Belgian Professional Manager of the Year: 1991

References

External links
Sport.be website - News 

1953 births
Living people
Flemish sportspeople
Association football midfielders
Belgian footballers
Belgium international footballers
Belgian expatriate footballers
Belgian Pro League players
Club Brugge KV players
R.S.C. Anderlecht players
Blau-Weiß 1890 Berlin players
K.A.A. Gent players
Genoa C.F.C. players
Serie A players
Bundesliga players
Expatriate footballers in Italy
Expatriate footballers in Germany
UEFA Euro 1980 players
UEFA Euro 1984 players
1986 FIFA World Cup players
Belgian football managers
K.A.A. Gent managers
Standard Liège managers
R.W.D. Molenbeek managers
R.S.C. Anderlecht managers
K.R.C. Genk managers
FC Twente managers
Belgium national football team managers
1. FSV Mainz 05 managers
Belgian expatriate sportspeople in Italy
Belgian expatriate sportspeople in Germany
Belgian expatriate sportspeople in the Netherlands
Expatriate football managers in the Netherlands
Belgian expatriate football managers